Adrián Martínez may refer to:

 Adrián Emmanuel Martínez (born 1992), Argentine footballer
 Adrián Nahuel Martínez (born 1992), Argentine footballer
 Adrian Martinez (actor), American actor and comedian
 Adrian Martinez (American football), American football player
 Adrián Martínez (baseball), Mexican baseball pitcher
 Adrián Martínez (Mexican footballer) (born 1970), Mexican football goalkeeper
 Adrián Martínez (Venezuelan footballer) (born 1993), Venezuelan football defender